"Experience" is an essay by Ralph Waldo Emerson. It was published in the collection Essays: Second Series in 1844. The essay is preceded by a poem of the same title. 

In one passage, Emerson speaks out against the effort to over-intellectualize life - and particularly against experiments to create utopias, or ideal communities. A wise and happy life, Emerson believes, requires a different attitude. The mention of "Education Farm" is a reference to Brook Farm, a short-lived utopian community founded by former Unitarian minister George Ripley and his wife Sophia Ripley.

Essays by Ralph Waldo Emerson
1844 essays